Colorless dreams — is a psychological drama directed by Ayub Shahobiddinov in 2020.

Plot 
The film features several important aspects of changing the human's nature: behind the prison walls, in society and in the family. After seventeen years of imprisonment, Kashmira returns to her Homeland. In her house, everything is quiet and calm and will always be so - Kashmira wants nothing to change in the house that she so eagerly sought, but after returning, events begin that she did not expect and was not ready.

Cast 

 Feruza Saidova — Kashmira
 Karim Mirxodiyev — Kashmira's father
 Shohida Ismoilova — Kashmira's mother

Release

This film was premiered at Lucania Film Festival in Italy on August 8, 2020. Later it was presented at several international festivals, including Kazan International Muslim Festival (Russia); Kinoshock Film Festival (Anapa, Russia;  Jogja-NETPAC Asian Film Festival (Indonesia); and Asiatica Film Festival (Italy).

Awards 
"Colorless dreams" was awarded Best Screenplay at Cinemaking International Film Festival in Dhaka, Bangladesh.

References 

2020 films